Ogasawarana nitida is a species of land snail with an operculum, a terrestrial gastropod mollusk in the family Helicinidae, the helicinids.

Distribution
This species is endemic to Japan.

References

Molluscs of Japan
Helicinidae
Gastropods described in 1980
Taxonomy articles created by Polbot